Daskroi  is a taluka of Ahmedabad District, India.

Towns and Villages

The table lists the "Towns and Villages" in Daskroi Taluka from census 2011

References

Talukas of Gujarat
Ahmedabad district